Māori religion encompasses the various religious beliefs and practices of the Māori, the Polynesian indigenous people of New Zealand.

Traditional Māori religion

Traditional Māori religion, that is, the pre-European belief-system of the Māori, differed little  from that of their tropical Eastern Polynesian homeland (Hawaiki Nui), conceiving of everything - including natural elements and all living things - as connected by common descent through whakapapa or genealogy. Accordingly, Māori regarded all things as possessing a  life force or mauri. Illustrating this concept of connectedness through genealogy are the major personifications dating from before the period of European contact:

 Tangaroa was the personification of the ocean and the ancestor or origin of all fish.
 Tāne was the personification of the forest and the origin of all birds.
 Rongo was the personification of peaceful activities and agriculture and the ancestor of cultivated plants.

(Some sources reference a supreme personification: Io; however this idea remains controversial.)

Tapu and mana
Māori followed certain practices that relate to traditional concepts like tapu. Certain people and objects contain mana -  spiritual  power or essence. In earlier times,  tribal members of a higher rank would not touch objects which belonged to members of a lower rank - to do so would constitute "pollution"; and persons of a lower rank could not touch the belongings of a highborn person without putting themselves at risk of death.

The word tapu can be interpreted as "sacred", as  "spiritual restriction" or as "implied prohibition"; it involves rules and prohibitions. Two kinds of tapu operate: private tapu (relating to individuals) and public tapu (relating to communities). A person, an object or a place which is tapu may not be touched by human contact, or in some cases, not even approached. A person, object or a place could be made sacred by tapu for a certain time.

In Māori society prior to European contact, tapu was one of the strongest forces in Māori life. A violation of tapu could have dire consequences, including the death of the offender through sickness or at the hands of someone affected by the offence. In earlier times food cooked for a person of high rank was tapu, and could not be eaten by an inferior. A chief's house was tapu, and even the chief could not eat food in the interior of his house. Not only were the houses of people of high rank perceived to be tapu, but also their possessions - including their clothing. Burial grounds (urupā) and places of death were always tapu, and protective fencing often surrounded such areas.

In the 21st century, Māori still observe tapu in matters relating to sickness, death, and burial:
 Tangihanga or funeral rites may take two or three days. The deceased lies in state, usually in an open coffin flanked by female relatives dressed in black, their heads sometimes wreathed in  kawakawa leaves, who take few and short breaks. During the day, visitors come, sometimes from great distances despite only a distant relationship, to address the deceased. They may speak frankly of his or her faults as well as virtues, but singing and joking are also appropriate. Free expression of grief by both men and women is encouraged. Mourners may invoke traditional beliefs and tell the deceased to return to the ancestral homeland, Hawaiki, by way of te rerenga wairua, the spirits' journey. The close kin or kiri mate ("dead skin") may not speak. On the last night, the pō whakamutunga (night of ending), the mourners hold a vigil and at sunrise the coffin is closed, before a church or marae funeral service and/or graveside interment ceremony, invariably Christian, takes place.  It is traditional for mourners to wash their hands in water and to sprinkle some on their heads before leaving a cemetery.  After the burial rites are completed, a feast is traditionally served. Mourners are expected to provide  koha or gifts towards the meal. After the burial, the home of the deceased and the place they died are ritually cleansed with karakia (prayers or incantations) and desanctified with food and drink, in a ceremony called takahi whare (trampling the house). That night, the pō whakangahau (night of entertainment) is a night of relaxation and rest. The widow or widower is not left alone for several nights following.
 During the following year, the kinfolk of a prominent deceased person will visit other marae, "bringing the death" (kawe mate) to them. They carry pictures of the deceased person on to the marae.
 Unveilings of headstones (hura kōwhatu) usually take place about a year after a death, often on a public holiday to accommodate visitors who could not get to the tangihanga. The dead are remembered and more grief expressed.

Christianity
In the early 19th century, many Māori embraced Christianity and its concepts. Large numbers of converts joined the Church of England and the Roman Catholic Church, both of which are still highly influential in Māori society. The Māori aspect of the Anglican Church in Aotearoa New Zealand has long been recognised by the ordination of Māori priests as Bishop of Aotearoa; a well-known and sometimes controversial holder of that title was the late Most Rev. Sir Whakahuihui Vercoe, who is remembered for a frank speech he delivered in the presence of Queen Elizabeth II during a Waitangi Day ceremony. The Roman Catholic Church also ordains Māori to high positions. Other churches were also locally successful in the 19th century, including, among others, the Presbyterian Church. The Church of Jesus Christ of Latter-day Saints was also very successful in gaining Maori converts from the 1880s on, and by 1901 there were nearly 4,000 Maori members in 79 branches. 

Today, Christian prayer (karakia) is the expected way to begin and end Māori public gatherings of many kinds. Prayers are also made at the beginning of many new projects, personal journeys, and endeavours.

Syncretic religions

In the 19th and early 20th centuries, several new syncretic religions arose, combining various aspects of Christianity with traditional and non-traditional Māori philosophies. These include:
 Pai Mārire ("Hauhau"), 1863
 Ringatū, 1868
 Church of the Seven Rules of Jehovah, 1890s
 followers of Rua Kenana Hepetipa at Maungapohatu, 1905
 Te Haahi Ratana, 1925
In the 2006 New Zealand Census, 16,419 people stated their religion as Ringatū, and 50,565 Ratana. The Ratana Church also has considerable political strength.

Islam

The proportion of Māori followers of Islam is low. Although the number of Māori Muslims grew rapidly at the end of the 20th century to 1,074 at the 2006 census, the total number of New Zealanders identifying as Māori was 565,329. Thus, the total number of identified Māori Muslims was 0.19 percent of the Māori population in 2006. This dropped to 0.1 percent in the 2018 census.

See also

Rangi and Papa
 Māori
 Māori culture
 Māori mythology

References

Further reading